The 2013 women's road cycling season was the fourth for the  Boels–Dolmans Cycling Team, which began as the Dolmans Landscaping Team in 2010.

Roster

As of 1 January 2013. Ages as of 1 January 2013.

Season victories

Results in major races

Single day races

Grand Tours

UCI World Ranking

The team finished eleventh in the UCI ranking for teams.

References

2013 UCI Women's Teams seasons
2013 in Dutch sport
2013 in women's road cycling
2013